Anthony Afolabi Adegbola was a Nigerian Professor of Animal science and former President of the Nigerian Academy of Science.  
In 1993, he was elected President of the Nigerian Academy of Science to succeeded Professor Akpanoluo Ikpong Ikpong Ette.

References

1929 births
Nigerian academics
Nigerian zoologists
Fellows of the Nigerian Academy of Science
Year of death missing